Colonel Lester Snover (May 16, 1895 – April 30, 1969), nicknamed "Bosco", was a pitcher in Major League Baseball. He played for the New York Giants.

References

External links

1895 births
1969 deaths
Major League Baseball pitchers
New York Giants (NL) players
Pittsfield Hillies players
Albany Senators players
Baseball players from Pennsylvania
Burials at Woodlawn Cemetery (Elmira, New York)